Heletz is a moshav in southern Israel. Located between Ashkelon, Kiryat Gat and Sderot, it falls under the jurisdiction of Hof Ashkelon Regional Council.

History
The moshav was founded in 1950 by immigrants from Yemen, and was named after the Biblical Helez, one of King David's Warriors (2 Samuel 23:26).

It was founded on  land belonging to the  depopulated  Palestinian village of Burayr.

Economy
The Heletz oil field was the location of the first successful oil well in the country, with extraction beginning in 1955 resulting in much celebration. It remains the most economic oil field in Israel.

Recently Avenue Group, Inc. and Tomco Energy have restarted production from the Heletz oil field. Three more wells are currently awaiting the delivery and installation of downhole pumps in preparation for their return to production. The companies have also retained the international consultant firm of TRACS International to study the oil and gas reserves underlying the Heletz field.

Tomco Energy had its shares suspended on 11 February 2009 stating contractual difficulties relating to the financing of its Heletz oil field operations.

References

Moshavim
Populated places established in 1950
Populated places in Southern District (Israel)
Yemeni-Jewish culture in Israel
1950 establishments in Israel